Center for Economics and Neuroscience (CENs)  is an interdisciplinary research institute at the University of Bonn in Germany.

History
It was founded in 2009 by neurologist Christian E. Elger, economist Armin Falk, Martin Reuter and Professor Dr. Bernd Weber (currently the dean of the faculty of medicine, University of Bonn), who set the goal of creating a platform for the field of neuroeconomics in Germany to contribute findings internationally and promote interdisciplinary work. CENs combines the knowledge and methods of neuroscience, behavioral genetics, medicine, psychology and empirical economic research to expand the understanding of human behavior, especially in economically relevant contexts. Since 2019 PD Dr. Schultz is the acting Director (provisional) of the CENs whose main research interests are social perception and decision-making.

Research
CENs is a central scientific facility at the University of Bonn. Its research includes the experimental economic research laboratory for conducting computer-aided behavioral experiments with up to 24 test subjects simultaneously, two fMRI scanners for behavioral experiments with interaction with functional and structural images and a biomolecular laboratory for genotyping various polymorphisms. With this applied methods the interdisciplinary research team studies the neurophysiological basis of economic decision-making. The research team consists of researchers of various scientific areas such as neuroscience, psychology and economics and includes directors, postdoctoral researchers, PhD candidates and associated members.

References

Research institutes in Germany
University of Bonn

de:Center for Economics and Neuroscience